Afterlife is a 2008 play by Michael Frayn.  It tells the life and career of Austrian theatrical director and actor Max Reinhardt, from the revival of the Salzburg Festival in 1920, which he helped to re-establish, until his death in New York in 1943.  It draws from Hugo von Hofmannsthal's 1911 play Jedermann (based on the sixteenth-century English morality play, Everyman), which Reinhardt directed at the Salzburg Festival for many years following its revival in 1920.

Afterlife was first performed in the Lyttelton auditorium of the National Theatre, London, on 11 June 2008. The play polarized critics.

The National Theatre production was directed by Michael Blakemore. The cast included Roger Allam as Max Reinhardt, Abigail Cruttenden as his mistress (and, later, wife) Helene Thimig, Selina Griffiths as his personal assistant Gusti Adler, Peter Forbes as his man of business, Rudolf 'Katie' Kommer, Glyn Grain as his valet Franz, David Burke as the Prince Archbishop of Salzburg, and David Schofield as Friedrich Müller.

References

External links
 Afterlife (script and Frayn's postscript), Michael Frayn (2008), published by Methuen, 

English plays
2008 plays
Biographical plays about actors
Cultural depictions of Austrian men
Cultural depictions of actors
Plays set in Austria
Plays based on other plays
Plays set in New York City